Birjand Airport  is a small airport near Birjand, Iran. Due to the geopolitical eminence of Birjand in the eastern parts of Iran, Birjand airport started operation in 1933 as the 3rd operational airport in Iran. Birjand airport offers non-stop daily flights to Tehran and Mashhad.

Birjand airport was established in 1933, beginning with small aircraft. The first passenger terminal was opened in 1976, and the same year saw the first flights from and to Mashhad as well as Tehran by Pars Air, the precursor of Iran Aseman Airlines.

History 
Birjand Airport is a small airport near Birjand, Iran. Due to the geopolitical eminence of Birjand in the eastern parts of Iran, Birjand airport started operation in 1933 as the 3rd operational airport in Iran. Birjand airport offers non-stop daily flights to Tehran and Mashhad. Birjand airport was established in 1933 but there were only flights for very small airplanes. There was no any passenger terminals till 1354 Hejri-Shamsi (1975). The first passenger terminal was established in 1355 Hejri-Shamsi and flights from Mashhad and Tehran to Birjand were opened in 1355 Hejri-Shamsi by Pars-Air (Aseman) and Iran-air agencies. The chief executive of the airport was Mr Habibollah Dehghan Noudeh between 1342 and 1362, he did hard working to build a modernized airport in Birjand. Mr Dehghan Noudeh did great efforts to make Birjand airport as one of important airports in Iran. In his era a passenger terminal, cargo terminal, police station, weather forecast station, and many other buildings including administration and office building, air control tower also were built. Due to his effort the flights were opened from Tehran and Mashhad to Birjand for the first time in 1355 (Hejri-shamsi) by Pars Air (Asseman) and also it was about to start Iran Air flights from Tehran to Birjand before 1357.
Birjand airport became an international airport after the first international flight to Medina, KSA in June 2008. In 2009, the runway 10/28 was refurbished and extended to 4000 meters to accommodate larger aircraft. During that time, Iran Aseman used the older runway 08/26 for the daily flights to Tehran.

In February 2012, Birjand International Airport saw the first traffic by a large aircraft, Iran Air's Airbus 300, on a test flight in order to prepare for Hajj traffic.

Birjand Airport has since opened a second passenger terminal to for the increasing number of passengers.

Airlines and destinations

References

External links

Birjand
Airports in Iran
1933 establishments in Iran
Airports established in 1933
Buildings and structures in South Khorasan Province
Transportation in South Khorasan Province